Milton Alexander Linder (born June 30, 1966) is an American white supremacist. He is the founder and editor of the Vanguard News Network (VNN), an antisemitic and white supremacist website and forum described by the Anti-Defamation League (ADL) as "one of the most active white supremacist sites on the Internet."

Linder is a former member of National Alliance, a political organisation considered by the Southern Poverty Law Center as "the country's most active and important neo-Nazi group" in the United States when he joined it.

Background

Linder was born and raised in Pittsburgh, Pennsylvania and graduated with a bachelor's degree from Pomona College in Claremont, California, in 1988, then worked as a researcher for CNN on the Evans & Novak political show, and then at The American Spectator.

Criminal record
On May 26, 2007, Linder organized what has been described as a "racially charged protest" linked to the Channon Christian and Christopher Newsom murder case in Knoxville, Tennessee, that attracted 30 supporters, around 60 counterprotesters, and 300 law enforcement officers. Linder fought with police and was the only person arrested. He was charged with disorderly conduct, resisting arrest, vandalism, and assault on a police officer. He was placed on six months probation and ordered to pay restitution to the police officer whom he assaulted.

Political life 
 
Linder is an ex-member of the National Alliance, a Holocaust denier, white separatist, neo-Nazi, and white nationalist group. He left after deciding to allow criticism of the National Alliance to appear on the VNN forums.

The Anti-Defamation League (ADL) reported that Linder announced in January 2005 his intention to establish the White Freedom Party, stating it was "America's first political party advocating Aryan interests and specifically naming the Jew as the agent of white genocide and greatest obstacle to our people's self-preservation as a distinct and protected people." It threatened to "WAGE NONSTOP WAR on the Jews, coloreds, and mainstream sellouts". Lacking financial backing, the "White Freedom Party" is currently dormant.

The Aryan Alternative
In 2004, Linder began publishing a tabloid newspaper called The Aryan Alternative. Four issues were published as of July 2010—the first issue was published in mid-2004. The most recent issue, July 2010 (#4), was published in mid-2009. The newspaper is distributed for free, but donations for it are solicited online.

In articles he has written for The Aryan Alternative newspaper, Linder claims that Jews have been and are consciously engaged in a conspiracy that is implementing a systematic program of genocide to exterminate the Aryan race.

References

External links
 
 Southern Poverty Law Center Profile

1966 births
Living people
Alt-right activists
Alt-right writers
American conspiracy theorists
American neo-Nazis
American people of Swiss-German descent
Pomona College alumni
Activists from Missouri